Groupama 4 (also Giacomo and Wizard) is a Volvo Open 70 yacht designed by Juan Kouyoumdjian. She won the 2011–12 Volvo Ocean Race skippered by Franck Cammas.Career
Groupama 4Groupama 4 was launched on 14 May 2011.

Giacomo
Renamed to Giacomo, it won the 2016 Sydney to Hobart Yacht Race. It has since been sold to David and Peter Askew and renamed Wizard''. In 2019 the American Volvo 70 Wizard has won RORC Caribbean 600 Trophy, scoring the best corrected time under IRC. Wizard put in a near faultless performance to complete the 600 mile non-stop race in 43 hours 38 minutes and 44 seconds.

Wizard
Wizard is also the overall IRC winner of the 2019 Rolex Fastnet Race.

References

2010s sailing yachts
Sailing yachts built in France
Sailboat type designs by Juan Kouyoumdjian
Sailing yachts of France
Volvo Ocean Race yachts
Volvo Open 70 yachts
Sydney to Hobart Yacht Race yachts